Joseph Cotter Smith (born May 29, 1949) is an American stage, film, and television actor.

Early life
He was born in Washington, D.C., the son of Madeline (née Cotter) and John Lewis Smith, Jr., who was a federal judge. He graduated from the Lawrenceville School in 1968. In 1972, he received his Bachelor of Arts degree in literature  at Trinity College, Hartford, Connecticut.

Smith's grandfather was an attorney, as are his brother and sister, and he said, "It was sort of assumed that I would be a lawyer, too." Instead, when he finished college, he became a teacher. After a few years, however, his interest turned to acting.

Career
He began his acting career in New York City in 1978, studying with Stella Adler and at the Actors Studio. His New York theater credits include the Broadway premiere productions of Next Fall, which was a 2010 Tony Award nominee for Best New Play, Wendy Wasserstein's An American Daughter) and Lanford Wilson's Burn This. He also co-starred with Judd Hirsch in the National Tour of the Tony Award-winning play Art. His numerous Off Broadway appearances include the Public Theater's Shakespeare in the Park production of "The Tempest' with Sam Waterston; Paula Vogel's Pulitzer Prize-winning How I Learned to Drive with Molly Ringwald; Charles Fuller's Pulitzer Prize-winning A Soldier's Play with Denzel Washington and Samuel L. Jackson; Michael Weller's Side Effects with Joely Richardson; Athol Fugard's The Blood Knot with Danny Glover; Horton Foote's The Old Friends with Betty Buckley; and the American Premiere of the Olivier Award-winning Cockfight Play, among many others. He was also a ten-year member of the Circle Repertory Company in New York working exclusively on the premiere productions of new American plays.

He is a co-founder of The Matrix Theatre Company in Los Angeles, where he has appeared in The Seagull, The Homecoming, Endgame, Mad Forest, and Habeas Corpus. Other Los Angeles performances include Romeo and Juliet, Love Letters, and Raft of the Medusa, as well as the West Coast premieres of "A Soldier's Play' and How I Learned to Drive at the Mark Taper Forum.

With his wife, Heidi Mueller Smith, he co-founded and served as Artistic Director of the Cornerstone Theatre Company in Milwaukee, Wisconsin from 2001 to 2007. Among his directing credits for the company are Edward Albee's The American Dream, Harold Pinter's Night School, and Lanford Wilson's The Gingham Dog.  His acting credits for the company include 12 Angry Men, Betrayal, Long Day's Journey into Night, and Educating Rita.

Smith has been nominated four times by the Los Angeles Drama Critics Circle, receiving the Outstanding Performance Award in 1996 for George M. Cohan's "The Tavern". He has received four Drama-Logue Awards and two Ovation Award nominations.

His television and film work ranges from his debut co-starring as Robert Kennedy (opposite Robert Blake's Jimmy Hoffa) in the mini-series Blood Feud, to his role as the President of the United States in the 20th Century Fox film, X2: X-Men United. Over the years he has appeared in many television shows, from his regular roles on the ABC series Equal Justice and Night Stalker to his more recent appearances on The Americans, Madam Secretary, Person of Interest, Forever, and The Good Wife.

Smith is also an acting teacher, for the past six years at The New School for Drama in New York, where he also served as the Department Head of the MFA Acting Program from 2015 to 2017. Prior to that he taught for several years at the Stella Adler Studio of Acting.

Personal life
Smith has been married to Heidi Mueller Smith since 2001. He was previously married to actress Mel Harris, with whom he has a daughter, Madeline, who is currently working on her PhD in history at the University of Chicago. He also has four stepchildren: Brianne, Christopher, Evan and Byron.

Filmography

References

External links
Cotter Smith Official Website (archived)

1949 births
Living people
American male stage actors
American male film actors
American male television actors
Male actors from Washington, D.C.
20th-century American male actors
21st-century American male actors
Lawrenceville School alumni
Trinity College (Connecticut) alumni